Hugh Barclay may refer to:

 Hugh Barclay of Ladyland ( 1592), Scottish Catholic and poet
 Hugh Barclay (lawyer) (1799–1884), Scottish lawyer and sheriff substitute of Perthshire
 Hugh Barclay (architect) (1829–1892), Scottish architect, see Kilmarnock
 Hugh Douglas Barclay (born 1932), New York State Senator and former United States Ambassador to El Salvador